Trace Creek may refer to:

Trace Creek (Castor River), a stream in Missouri
Trace Creek (Cub Creek), a stream in Missouri
Trace Creek (Twelvemile Creek), a stream in Missouri